Liogma is a genus of crane fly in the family Cylindrotomidae.

Biology
The larvae of the genus Liogma live on mosses. Adults are to be found in damp wooded habitats.

Distribution
Canada, United States, China, Russian Far East, Japan, Taiwan.

Species
L. brevipecten Alexander, 1932
L. brunneistigma Alexander, 1949
L. mikado (Alexander, 1919)
L. nodicornis (Osten Sacken, 1865)
L. pectinicornis Alexander, 1928
L. serraticornis Alexander, 1919
L. simplicicornis Alexander, 1940

References

 

Cylindrotomidae
Diptera of North America
Diptera of Asia
Taxa named by Carl Robert Osten-Sacken